HID Global is an American manufacturer of secure identity products.  The company is an independent brand of Assa Abloy, a Swedish door and access control conglomerate. Björn Lidefelt was appointed CEO on 27 January 2020. He succeeded Stefan Widing, who led HID Global for over four years.

History 

Originally formed to develop radio frequency identification technologies, HID Global was formed in 1991 as Hughes Identification Devices, a subsidiary of Hughes Aircraft Company with offices in California and Scotland. The original 125-kilohertz and 400-kilohertz proximity technology had been pioneered by Destron/IDI (formerly Identification Devices Inc.), in Boulder, Colorado, and used primarily for Animal Identification and Proximity Access Control, and to a lesser degree in Manufacturing Processes, Tyre tracking and a few other Asset Identification applications. Already a supplier to Destron/ID of low-frequency microchips, Hughes Aircraft Company acquired exclusive rights to the Access Control and Industrial markets, leading to the formation of Hughes Identification Devices.

In 1994 the office in Scotland was closed and the European business passed to a UK based independent distributor, ID Plus Ltd who were later acquired by HID Corporation Ltd in August 1999.

In October 1995, Hughes management, with help from Citibank Venture Capital, combined its military communications and display products groups with its AML Wireless Systems organization and Hughes Identification Devices (HID) to form Palomar Technologies Corporation. It was at that point that the decision was made to focus efforts on RFID for physical access control, and five years later, the company was acquired by the world's largest lock-maker, Swedish conglomerate Assa Abloy AB.

Products 
The company sells physical access control products, logical access control products, and secure issuance products that comprise cards, readers, smart card readers (OMNIKEY), networked access products, card printer/encoders (FARGO) and software. Its other business segments includes virtualization technology, cashless payment, government ID, RFID for industry and logistics and Animal ID solutions and professional services.

HID manufactures and licenses several types of technologies, from Wiegand products to 13.56 MHz iCLASS, MIFARE, and DESFire, as well as the 125 kHz Indala and Prox cards. Migration readers from various 125 kHz Prox technologies to 13.56 MHz iCLASS were introduced in 2007.

Manufacturing
The company is based in Austin, Texas with other production facilities in Asia and Europe. Some of these facilities are located in Hong Kong, China and Galway, Ireland. It also has research and development centers in Cardiff, UK, Zabierzow, Poland,  Fremont and Mountain View in Northern California. The company also has a design facility in Chennai, India.

Partners
HID Global serves a variety of partner such as OEMs, system integrators, application developers and channel partners in domestic and international markets. Some OEM partners include Siemens, Honeywell, Lenel (UTC Fire & Security), and Tyco. The company also partners with computer manufacturers to create new products. HID worked with Dell to develop HID on the Desktop, a three-component PC logon application that won the 2009 Smart Card Alliance Award for Outstanding Technology. HID later partnered with Panasonic to integrate an HID Global RFID module into Panasonic's Personal Identification Mini Dock to support reading biometric passports.

HID Global also worked with Inside Secure (formally known as Inside Contactless) and US Bank to supply HID iCLASS contactless smart card technology in the US Bank PayID card program that was the 2010 Paybefore Award Winner for Best Innovative Program. The PayID card program uses an all-purpose card to provide contactless physical access to U.S. Bank facilities, along with contactless payment and traditional magnetic stripe cards for purchases made by U.S. Bank employees.

Customers
End-users of HID products primarily include government, financial, corporate, education and healthcare markets.

 HID Global supplies its readers and credentials for access control to Banco do Nordeste of Brasil, Employers Mutual Casualty Company 
 HID Global provides network access control to the China Pacific Insurance Co. and Jinwan District People's Procuratorate located in Sihucheng District, Zhuhai city. 
 HID Global supplied card customization products and services to Amway India and Action Ambulance Service.
The United States Secret Service uses differently-colored HID iClass SEOS proximity cards as identification badges for anyone requiring access to the White House, Eisenhower Executive Office Building, or New Executive Office Building. Differently-colored badges issued to staff, interns, and members of the press indicate the areas to which they are allowed unescorted access within the White House complex.

Distributors 
HID Global's world-class partner community includes Integrators, Distributors, OEMS, Managed Services Providers, Embedded OEMS and Technical Alliance Partners that help organizations identify, purchase and implement the most extensive line of powerful and versatile security products.

 1991: Formed as Hughes Identification Devices, a subsidiary of Hughes Aircraft
 1995: Became a subsidiary of Palomar Technological Companies, changed name to HID Corporation
 1996: Acquired Sensor Engineering, adding Wiegand products
 2000: Acquired by Assa Abloy AB 
 2001: HID acquired Motorola's Indala RFID access control business
 2003: Acquired the card and reader business of Dorado Products, Inc.
 2006: Acquired Fargo Electronics, adding card issuance technology
 2006: Merged with Assa Abloy sister company Indala
 2006: Formed HID Global
 2007: Acquired Integrated Engineering, adding flexible MIFARE-based reader technology
 2008: Merger of HID Global and Assa Abloy Identification Technologies Group 
 2010: Acquired ActivIdentity for US$162 million - is active in intelligent identity 
 2011: Acquired LaserCard, a provider of secure ID products, for US$80 million. 
 2012: Acquired EasyLobby for secure visitor management software and products.
 2013: Acquired Codebench for FIPS 201 integration with physical access control systems 
 2014: Acquired Lumidigm for biometric authentication solutions 
 2014: Acquired IdenTrust, a provider of digital identities
 2015: Acquired IAI, a provider of personalization solutions for identity documents 
 2015: Acquired Quantum Secure, a provider of identity management software
 2016: Acquired DemoTeller, a provider of instant issuance solutions for the financial market
 2017: Acquired Mercury Security, an OEM supplier of controllers for physical access control 
 2018: Acquired Crossmatch, a leader in biometric enrollment and identity devices
 2019: Acquired PTI Security Systems, the worldwide leader in access control for the self-storage industry
 2020: HID acquired Access-IS, a technology provider of miniaturised reader devices said to be ideal for mission-critical environments

References 

1991 establishments in Texas
Manufacturing companies established in 1991
Manufacturing companies based in Austin, Texas